Orocrambus thymiastes is a moth in the family Crambidae. It was described by Edward Meyrick in 1901. This species is endemic to New Zealand, where it has been recorded from Southland. O. thymiastes prefers habitat that consists of boggy areas. This species is associated with Chionochloa rubra.

The wingspan is 18–23 mm.

References

Crambinae
Moths described in 1901
Moths of New Zealand
Endemic fauna of New Zealand
Taxa named by Edward Meyrick
Endemic moths of New Zealand